The Statue of Georg Zoëga is a statue of the Danish archeologist Georg Zoëga located in the garden of the Ny Carlsberg Glyptotek, facing Tietgensgade, in Copenhagen, Denmark. It was created by Ludvig Brandstrup and unveiled in 1911.

Description
The monument consists of a bronze sculpture standing on a granite plinth and measures . Zoëga is depicted sitting on a chair and studying a diminutive version of a Greek statue of a woman which he holds in his left hand. He wear a cape, which, much like a Roman toga, is swept around his raised arm. The oval granite plinth is decorated with bronze festoons.

History
A model of the statue was commissioned by Carl Jacobsen in 1908 to mark the 100th anniversary of Zoëga's death the following year. He confirmed the commission in a letter dated 25 October 1908.

The mentioned "Carstens statue" is Theobald Stein's statue of Asmus Jacob Carstens on the other side of the building (facing Niels Brocks Gade). The Zoëga statue was cast in bronze in Lauritz Rasmussen's Bronze Foundry. The monument was unveiled in 1911.

Other versions
A figurine in burnt clay from 1909 is owned by the Ny Carlsberg Glyptotek (Inv.no. 1735). Another 32,-cm high figurine in unburnt clay is owned by the Hirschsprung Collection.

References

External links

Monuments and memorials in Copenhagen
Outdoor sculptures in Copenhagen
Statues of men in Copenhagen
Bronze sculptures in Copenhagen
Sculptures by Ludvig Brandstrup
1911 sculptures
1911 establishments in Denmark
Buildings and structures completed in 1911